Lagutin is a rural locality (a khutor) in Bolsheternovskoye Rural Settlement, Chernyshkovsky District, Volgograd Oblast, Russia. The population was 35 as of 2010.

Geography 
Lagutin is located on the Don plain, 25 km northeast of Chernyshkovsky (the district's administrative centre) by road. Bolsheternovoy is the nearest rural locality.

References 

Rural localities in Chernyshkovsky District